Andrew Tuason (born 30 November 1962) is a Hong Kong musician, record producer, composer, songwriter, arranger, conductor and musical director. He has been a producer and musical director for notable artists including Jacky Cheung, Andy Lau, Jackie Chan, Alan Tam and Coco Lee.

Early life 
Tuason was born in Hong Kong, the son of Bading Tuason, musical director for the Hong Kong Hilton from 1968 - 1996.  In 1982, Tuason became assistant to Joseph Koo, known as the Godfather of Cantopop. Koo became Tuason's mentor in his musical career and entry into the Hong Kong music business. 

Working as an assistant for Koo, Tuason showed his skills and talent as an arranger and keyboardist to many major records label in Hong Kong. Tuason became arranger, keyboardist, or composer for artists including: Jacky Cheung, Sam Hui, Alan Tam, Paula Tsui, Michael Kwan, Roman Tam, Jenny Tsang, Shirley Kwan, Sandy Lam, Cass Pang, Eason Chan, Coco Lee, Faye Wong, Andy Lau, among others.

Career 
Tuason first met with Andy Lau in the late 80s when he was hired as a musical director and Pianist for Lau for his North America concert tour, at the time Lau was a newcomer in singing career but he was already popular and famous in TVs and movies, the two work closely together after their US tour and Tuason began to produce Lau recording albums since then. In 1992, Tuason and Lau had formed a record label called: New Melody, they had also built a recording studio (Q-Sound Studio) in Tsim Sha Tsui area, which later on becoming one of the busiest studios in the business. Tuason had produced 7 solo albums for Lau from 1992 to 1996, he had composed one of Lau biggest hit track "Ai Bu Wan", the song had reached to number one on all major pop charts in HK both on radio and TVs. Of all the 7 albums of Lau, more than half of it went to the top-selling Canto pop albums in the 90s, Tuason has also done more than 60 live concerts with Lau as his musical director during those years.

In 1996, Tuason joined EMI HK as A&R Director, his biggest achievement in EMI was on Cass Pang "Chuang Wai" album which had sold more than 300,000 three hundred thousand copies alone. Tuason's highlighted career is when he was appointed by Television Broadcast Ltd as musical director for the ceremony of Hong Kong Reunification to China in 1997, where he had arranged and conducted the Hong Kong Philharmonic Orchestra and Chinese Orchestra combine to perform one of China classical masterpiece "The Yellow River Piano Concerto". Tuason had invited his classical piano teacher, the well-known concert pianist in HK Cai Chong Li to play on the Piano Concerto.

Tuason was the musical director for the Jacky Cheung musical Snow, Wolf, Lake, Cheung and Tuason had toured together with some 80 crew members in China and Hong Kong for more than 50 musical shows during 2004 and 2005. Cheung and Tuason had worked together enormously over the past 10 years, after the musical they have done 2 world tour which had sold more than 250 concerts worldwide, and Tuason had produced 2 albums for Cheung - Private Corner in 2009 and Wake up Dreaming in 2014

On January 13, 2020, Tuason had made his debut appearance as musical director and Solo Pianist on China National TV (东方卫视 Oriental TV Shanghai) for the Duet competition of Hacken Lee and Chou Shen on the most popular TV musical program in 2019 - (我们的歌), Tuason had re-arranged Jacky Cheung classic song "Your name, my Surname" with which the duet won first prize in the competition, the video clip has seen by over 5 million online viewers in China alone, and the review was overwhelming by the public.

In 2022, the Hong Kong government Leisure Culture and Services Department organized the "Jazz Up" series presenting "The Andrew Tuason Big Band".

Andy Lau
Tuason began producing Andy Lau of The Four Heavenly Kings in 1988. Tuason continued producing, arranging and composing for seven albums by Andy Lau from 1988 - 1996.

EMI Asia
Tuason became A&R Director for EMI Asia from 1996 - 1999. During this time, he was in charge of the repertoire of all of EMI Hong Kong's recording artists.

Jacky Cheung
Tuason began arranging for Jacky Cheung in 1985 until the present. In 2004, Tuason conducted Jacky Cheung's musical production "Snow.Wolf.Lake".

In 2009, Tuason produced Jacky Cheung's "Private Corner" album. It is Cheung's first jazz album for which he coined the phrase "Canto-jazz". "Everyday Is Christmas", "Which Way, Robert Frost?", "Let It Go", "Lucky in Love" and "Double Trouble" were co-written by Roxanne Seeman in collaboration with Tuason, tailor-made for Cheung. "Lucky in Love" is the end-credit song of "Crossing Hennessy", Hong Kong movie starring Jacky Cheung and Tang Wei, produced by William Kong. Nokia's music download service website (Ovi.com) announced that "Everyday Is Christmas" was the 10th most downloaded Christmas song in the world in 2010, joining classic hits such as Wham's ‘Last Christmas’ and Mariah Carey's "All I Want for Christmas is You". Cheung is the only Chinese language singer to make it into the Top Ten.

Awards & achievement 
1987 RTHK Top Ten Chinese Gold songs award - Winner (Best Arranger) for Danny Chan song "My Story"
1991 RTHK Top Ten Chinese Gold songs award - Ten Best Gold Song award (Songwriter) for Andy Lau song "Ai Bu Wan"
1991 Shanghai Asia Music Competition - Winner (Best Songwriter) for Anthony Lun song "Goodbye My Love"
1997 Appointment by Television and Broadcast Ltd and Beijing Television BTV as the musical director for the 1997 Handover Ceremony of Hong Kong
2006 TVB Jade Solid Gold Best 10 Awards - Winner (Best Arranger) for Andy Lau song "Open your Eyes"
2009 Guangzhou Music Extravaganza Award - Winner (Best Songwriter) for Hins Cheung song "Wedding Ring"
2011 Global Chinese Gold song Award - Winner (Best song Producer) for Jacky Cheung Album "Private Corner"

Producer credits 
Jacky Cheung - Private Corner
Jacky Cheung - Private Corner Mini-Concert
Jacky Cheung - 1/2 Century Tour
Jacky Cheung - Wake Up Dreaming
Andy Lau - from 1990 to 1995 for 7 albums
Cass Pang - from 1996 to 1999 for 5 albums
George Lam 2 albums
Eric Moo 3 albums
Jenny Tseng
Hins Cheung
Joey Yung
Dave Wang
Sam Lee
Kenny Bee - To Bee Continue

Musical Director 
Jacky Cheung
Jackie Chan
Andy Lau
Sandy Lam
Kenny Bee
Faye Wong
Coco Lee
George Lam
Sally Yeh
Jenny Tseng
Eric Moo
Priscilla Chan
Danny Chan
Hacken Lee
Vivian Chow
Alan Tam
Dave Wang
Joey Yung
Hins Cheung

Arranger 
Jacky Cheung
Andy Lau
Coco Lee
Sandy Lam
George Lam
Jenny Tseng
Danny Chan
Cass Pang
Eric Moo
Jackie Chan
Faye Wong
Kelly Chan
Joey Yung
Hins Cheung
Kenny Bee
Alan Tam
Stefanie Sun
Hacken Lee
Roman Tam
Dave Wang

Composer
Andy Lau
Sandy Lam
Hacken Lee
Cass Pang
Faye Wong
Eric Moo
Dave Wang
Jeff Chang
Jenny Tseng
George Lam
Danny Chan

References 

 id=uGY4CgAAQBAJ&pg=PT419&lpg=PT419&dq=bading+tuason&source=bl&ots=XkCjhslcEA&sig=a5AUnxEkeDs1z_yY652JgoRrjD4&hl=en&sa=X&ved=0ahUKEwjmwYuWxPHJAhVN52MKHf8zD4QQ6AEIKjAE#v=onepage&q=bading%20tuason&f=false
 http://www.mediaandmarketing.com/13Writer/Profiles/MIX.Hong_Kong_Studios.html
Stage photos in the 1997 production（xinghuanet）

External links
 
http://www.discogs.com/artist/4497701-Bading-Tuason https://books.google.com/books?
"First China National TV Appearance" https://www.youtube.com/watch?v=r2v1VuMuv4s

Music directors
Hong Kong record producers
Music arrangers
1962 births
Living people